Shara'b Ar Rawnah District is a district of the Taiz Governorate, Yemen. As of 2003, the district had a population of 186,955 inhabitants.

Etymology
Shara'b Ar Rawnah is part of the Shara'b Mikhlaf that includes both Shara'b As Salam and Shara'b Ar Rawnah.  The Mikhlaf was founded by the tribe of Banu Shar'ab, which is a tribe from Himyar. According to al-Hamdani and Nashwan al-Himyari, it is descended from Shar'ab Ibn Sahl Ibn Zaid Ibn 'Amru Ibn Qais Ibn Jusham Ibn Abd Shams Ibn Wail Ibn al-Ghwth Ibn Qotn Ibn 'Aurib Ibn Zuhir Ibn Aiman Ibn Homisa' Ibn Himyar. Ibn al-Kalbi and Ibn Khaldun say Shar'ab Ibn Qais without "Sahl Ibn Zaid Ibn ‘Amru". According to Ibn Sidah the word Sharoob means dates in classical Arabic and Shar'ab means a tall person with a well shaped body. The Sharabi spears and an outer cloak called al-Shar'abiah are attributed to the tribe of Shara'b.

Sub-districts
 Al-Ahtub
 Al-Asad
 Al-Ashjub
 Al-Ashraf
 Al-Gharbi
 Al-Hasyah
 Al-Hayajim
 Al-Malawhah
 Ar-Ra'inah
 Awadir
 Az-Zagharir
 Az-Zarari
 Bani Husam
 Bani Murir
 Bani Sari
 Bani Sumi'
 Bani Ziad
 Hilyah
 Murkhah
 Nisf al-Ozal
 Sharqi Himyar

References

 
Districts of Taiz Governorate